The Tomsk constituency (No.181) is a Russian legislative constituency in Tomsk Oblast. During 1993-1995 the constituency covered urban Tomsk but Tomsk Oblast lost its second constituency prior to the 1995 election, so in 1995-2007 Tomsk constituency served as a single constituency in the region covering the whole oblast. Tomsk Oblast regained its second constituency in 2016 and in its current configuration Tomsk constituency includes parts of Tomsk, ZATO Seversk and eastern Tomsk Oblast.

Members elected

Election results

1993

|-
! colspan=2 style="background-color:#E9E9E9;text-align:left;vertical-align:top;" |Candidate
! style="background-color:#E9E9E9;text-align:left;vertical-align:top;" |Party
! style="background-color:#E9E9E9;text-align:right;" |Votes
! style="background-color:#E9E9E9;text-align:right;" |%
|-
|style="background-color:#0085BE"|
|align=left|Vladimir Bauer
|align=left|Choice of Russia
|
|24.32%
|-
|style="background-color:"|
|align=left|Sergey Ilyin
|align=left|Independent
|
|13.61%
|-
|style="background-color:"|
|align=left|Andrey Vedernikov
|align=left|Independent
|
|13.38%
|-
|style="background-color:"|
|align=left|Boris Yachmenev
|align=left|Independent
|
|12.70%
|-
|style="background-color:"|
|align=left|Irina Vakhrusheva
|align=left|Independent
|
|11.09%
|-
|style="background-color:"|
|align=left|Vladimir Tirsky
|align=left|Independent
|
|3.12%
|-
|style="background-color:#000000"|
|colspan=2 |against all
|
|21.78%
|-
| colspan="5" style="background-color:#E9E9E9;"|
|- style="font-weight:bold"
| colspan="3" style="text-align:left;" | Total
| 
| 100%
|-
| colspan="5" style="background-color:#E9E9E9;"|
|- style="font-weight:bold"
| colspan="4" |Source:
|
|}

1995

|-
! colspan=2 style="background-color:#E9E9E9;text-align:left;vertical-align:top;" |Candidate
! style="background-color:#E9E9E9;text-align:left;vertical-align:top;" |Party
! style="background-color:#E9E9E9;text-align:right;" |Votes
! style="background-color:#E9E9E9;text-align:right;" |%
|-
|style="background-color:"|
|align=left|Stepan Sulakshin (incumbent)
|align=left|Independent
|
|21.47%
|-
|style="background-color:"|
|align=left|Aleksandr Pomorov
|align=left|Communist Party
|
|15.92%
|-
|style="background-color:"|
|align=left|Sergey Zhvachkin
|align=left|Independent
|
|14.66%
|-
|style="background-color:#2C299A"|
|align=left|Yury Galvas
|align=left|Congress of Russian Communities
|
|8.90%
|-
|style="background-color:#DA2021"|
|align=left|Vladimir Bauer (incumbent)
|align=left|Ivan Rybkin Bloc
|
|7.75%
|-
|style="background-color:"|
|align=left|Boris Shaydullin
|align=left|Yabloko
|
|4.17%
|-
|style="background-color:#CE1100"|
|align=left|Lyubov Babich
|align=left|My Fatherland
|
|3.43%
|-
|style="background-color:"|
|align=left|Andrey Vedernikov
|align=left|Independent
|
|3.42%
|-
|style="background-color:"|
|align=left|Valery Lukashov
|align=left|Liberal Democratic Party
|
|3.12%
|-
|style="background-color:"|
|align=left|Viktor Kovalevsky
|align=left|Independent
|
|3.03%
|-
|style="background-color:#F21A29"|
|align=left|Aleksey Troshin
|align=left|Trade Unions and Industrialists – Union of Labour
|
|1.83%
|-
|style="background-color:#D50000"|
|align=left|Aleksandr Karakulov
|align=left|Communists and Working Russia - for the Soviet Union
|
|1.54%
|-
|style="background-color:"|
|align=left|Viktor Arkashev
|align=left|Independent
|
|1.04%
|-
|style="background-color:"|
|align=left|Viktor Pastukhov
|align=left|Independent
|
|0.53%
|-
|style="background-color:"|
|align=left|Nikolay Tishkov
|align=left|Independent
|
|0.38%
|-
|style="background-color:#000000"|
|colspan=2 |against all
|
|5.68%
|-
| colspan="5" style="background-color:#E9E9E9;"|
|- style="font-weight:bold"
| colspan="3" style="text-align:left;" | Total
| 
| 100%
|-
| colspan="5" style="background-color:#E9E9E9;"|
|- style="font-weight:bold"
| colspan="4" |Source:
|
|}

1999

|-
! colspan=2 style="background-color:#E9E9E9;text-align:left;vertical-align:top;" |Candidate
! style="background-color:#E9E9E9;text-align:left;vertical-align:top;" |Party
! style="background-color:#E9E9E9;text-align:right;" |Votes
! style="background-color:#E9E9E9;text-align:right;" |%
|-
|style="background-color:"|
|align=left|Yegor Ligachyov
|align=left|Independent
|
|22.18%
|-
|style="background-color:"|
|align=left|Gennady Khandorin
|align=left|Independent
|
|21.97%
|-
|style="background-color:"|
|align=left|Stepan Sulakshin (incumbent)
|align=left|Independent
|
|18.66%
|-
|style="background-color:"|
|align=left|Oleg Pletnev
|align=left|Yabloko
|
|14.68%
|-
|style="background-color:#E98282"|
|align=left|Marina Senkovskaya
|align=left|Women of Russia
|
|6.94%
|-
|style="background-color:#1042A5"|
|align=left|Nelli Krechetova
|align=left|Union of Right Forces
|
|5.20%
|-
|style="background-color:"|
|align=left|Yevgeny Kostyuchenko
|align=left|Independent
|
|0.62%
|-
|style="background-color:"|
|align=left|Aleksandr Tolkachev
|align=left|Independent
|
|0.36%
|-
|style="background-color:#000000"|
|colspan=2 |against all
|
|8.04%
|-
| colspan="5" style="background-color:#E9E9E9;"|
|- style="font-weight:bold"
| colspan="3" style="text-align:left;" | Total
| 
| 100%
|-
| colspan="5" style="background-color:#E9E9E9;"|
|- style="font-weight:bold"
| colspan="4" |Source:
|
|}

2003

|-
! colspan=2 style="background-color:#E9E9E9;text-align:left;vertical-align:top;" |Candidate
! style="background-color:#E9E9E9;text-align:left;vertical-align:top;" |Party
! style="background-color:#E9E9E9;text-align:right;" |Votes
! style="background-color:#E9E9E9;text-align:right;" |%
|-
|style="background-color:"|
|align=left|Vladimir Zhidkikh
|align=left|United Russia
|
|52.50%
|-
|style="background-color:"|
|align=left|Yegor Ligachyov (incumbent)
|align=left|Communist Party
|
|23.31%
|-
|style="background-color:"|
|align=left|Aleksey Biryukov
|align=left|Liberal Democratic Party
|
|4.50%
|-
|style="background-color:#00A1FF"|
|align=left|Tatyana Kostyukova
|align=left|Party of Russia's Rebirth-Russian Party of Life
|
|4.10%
|-
|style="background-color:#7C73CC"|
|align=left|Yevgeny Krotov
|align=left|Great Russia–Eurasian Union
|
|1.71%
|-
|style="background-color:"|
|align=left|Boris Markelov
|align=left|Independent
|
|0.83%
|-
|style="background-color:#164C8C"|
|align=left|Anatoly Koshelev
|align=left|United Russian Party Rus'
|
|0.76%
|-
|style="background-color:#000000"|
|colspan=2 |against all
|
|11.33%
|-
| colspan="5" style="background-color:#E9E9E9;"|
|- style="font-weight:bold"
| colspan="3" style="text-align:left;" | Total
| 
| 100%
|-
| colspan="5" style="background-color:#E9E9E9;"|
|- style="font-weight:bold"
| colspan="4" |Source:
|
|}

2016

|-
! colspan=2 style="background-color:#E9E9E9;text-align:left;vertical-align:top;" |Candidate
! style="background-color:#E9E9E9;text-align:leftt;vertical-align:top;" |Party
! style="background-color:#E9E9E9;text-align:right;" |Votes
! style="background-color:#E9E9E9;text-align:right;" |%
|-
| style="background-color: " |
|align=left|Aleksey Didenko
|align=left|Liberal Democratic Party
|
|34.10%
|-
|style="background:"| 
|align=left|Aleksandr Rostovtsev
|align=left|A Just Russia
|
|17.25%
|-
|style="background-color:"|
|align=left|Aleksey Fyodorov
|align=left|Communist Party
|
|15.31%
|-
|style="background:"| 
|align=left|Andrey Volkov
|align=left|Communists of Russia
|
|7.32%
|-
|style="background:"| 
|align=left|Vasily Yeryomin
|align=left|Yabloko
|
|6.38%
|-
|style="background-color:"|
|align=left|Sergey Zhabin
|align=left|The Greens
|
|4.52%
|-
|style="background:"| 
|align=left|Yegor Belyanko
|align=left|Party of Growth
|
|4.25%
|-
|style="background:"| 
|align=left|Yevgeny Krotov
|align=left|Patriots of Russia
|
|2.86%
|-
| colspan="5" style="background-color:#E9E9E9;"|
|- style="font-weight:bold"
| colspan="3" style="text-align:left;" | Total
| 
| 100%
|-
| colspan="5" style="background-color:#E9E9E9;"|
|- style="font-weight:bold"
| colspan="4" |Source:
|
|}

2021

|-
! colspan=2 style="background-color:#E9E9E9;text-align:left;vertical-align:top;" |Candidate
! style="background-color:#E9E9E9;text-align:left;vertical-align:top;" |Party
! style="background-color:#E9E9E9;text-align:right;" |Votes
! style="background-color:#E9E9E9;text-align:right;" |%
|-
| style="background-color: " |
|align=left|Aleksey Didenko (incumbent)
|align=left|Liberal Democratic Party
|
|22.33%
|-
|style="background-color: " |
|align=left|Ilya Leontyev
|align=left|United Russia
|
|21.91%
|-
|style="background-color:"|
|align=left|Vasily Shipilov
|align=left|Communist Party
|
|18.04%
|-
|style="background:"| 
|align=left|Aleksandr Rostovtsev
|align=left|A Just Russia — For Truth
|
|10.80%
|-
|style="background-color: "|
|align=left|Aleksandr Tsin-De-Shan
|align=left|New People
|
|7.90%
|-
|style="background-color: "|
|align=left|Viktor Grinev
|align=left|Party of Pensioners
|
|4.99%
|-
|style="background-color: " |
|align=left|Yelena Ulyanova
|align=left|Party of Growth
|
|3.67%
|-
|style="background-color: " |
|align=left|Vasily Yeryomin
|align=left|Yabloko
|
|3.01%
|-
|style="background-color:"|
|align=left|Yevgeny Krotov
|align=left|Rodina
|
|2.36%
|-
| colspan="5" style="background-color:#E9E9E9;"|
|- style="font-weight:bold"
| colspan="3" style="text-align:left;" | Total
| 
| 100%
|-
| colspan="5" style="background-color:#E9E9E9;"|
|- style="font-weight:bold"
| colspan="4" |Source:
|
|}

Notes

References

Russian legislative constituencies
Politics of Tomsk Oblast